Stefano Procida (born 14 February 1990) is an Italian footballer who plays for A.S.D. Akragas 2018.

Career 
Procida started his professional career with Torino F.C. He was the member of the U17 team in 2006–07 season. In the next season Procida was a member of the U18 team as well as the reserve. On 31 January 2008 Procida was sold to S.S.C. Napoli in co-ownership deal for a nominal fee of €500. After 2 half seasons with Napoli reserve, Procida returned to Torino in January 2009 for free.

In January 2010 Procida was sold to Ternana in another co-ownership deal. In June 2010 Torino gave up the remain 50% registration rights. Procida played 5 games for Ternana in 2010–11 Lega Pro Prima Divisione. In January 2011 Procida left for fellow third division club Alessandria in a new co-ownership deal. Procida only played twice for his new club. The club finished as the last and relegated. In June 2011 Ternana also gave up the rights.

Procida only played 3 times in 2011–12 Lega Pro Seconda Divisione. In January 2012 Procida left for Belgian Second Division club Visé.

On 12 September 2019, Procida joined A.S.D. Akragas 2018.

References

External links
 Football.it Profile 
 
 Stefano Procida at TuttoCampo

Italian footballers
Italian expatriate footballers
1990 births
Living people
Torino F.C. players
Ternana Calcio players
U.S. Alessandria Calcio 1912 players
C.S. Visé players
U.S. Vibonese Calcio players
A.S.D. HSL Derthona players
A.C. Cuneo 1905 players
Serie C players
Serie D players
Association football defenders
Italian expatriate sportspeople in Belgium
Expatriate footballers in Belgium
Pinerolo F.C. players